Shahrak-e Taleqani (also Romanized as Shahrak-e Ţāleqānī) is a village in Ramjerd-e Yek Rural District, in the Central District of Marvdasht County, Fars Province, Iran. At the 2006 census, its population was 479, in 109 families.

References 

Populated places in Marvdasht County